Lisseth Chavez  is an American actress known for her roles in Chicago P.D., The OA, and The Fosters. Chavez appears as Esperanza "Spooner" Cruz in the sixth and seventh seasons of the CW superhero series Legends of Tomorrow.

Personal life 
Chavez is of Salvadoran heritage.

Career 
Chavez worked as a model early in her career. She first appeared to TV audiences in 2009's reality beauty contest, True Beauty. She acted professionally for the first time in an episode of The Baby (2011).  Chavez has appeared in individual episodes of Southland, Shameless, Lucifer, Rizzoli & Isles, and others.  She started to garner more significant roles starting in 2016 with her work on The Night Shift, followed by a featured character run on The Fosters. She played characters with multiple episode-arcs on Station 19 and The OA in 2019.

Chavez lead role has grown to include her playing rookie officer Vanessa Rojas on NBC's "Chicago" franchise shows (Chicago P.D., Chicago Med, and Chicago Fire), a role originally designed to create long-term romantic tension with character Kevin Atwater, initiated in season seven of the series, but cut short by the COVID-19 pandemic. The character arc ended there, as it was announced during the break that Chavez could not return to complete her character's story-line.  This was due to the fact the character "...never entirely clicked with fans or the producers."  The timing of the change, however, allowed Chavez to take on the new role of a tech-geek with a tragic past, Esperanza "Spooner" Cruz, in The CW's Legends of Tomorrow sixth season. In the episode "The Fixed Point" (2022), Cruz comes out as asexual; she is the first Arrowverse character to do so.

Awards and recognition 
In 2020, the Imagen Awards, referred to by the industry as the "Latino Golden Globes," nominated Chavez in the 'Best Supporting Actress: Television' category for her work on Chicago P.D.

Filmography

Film

Television

References

External links 
 

Living people
21st-century American actresses
American film actresses
American television actresses
American web series actresses
American people of Salvadoran descent
Hispanic and Latino American actresses
Place of birth missing (living people)
Year of birth missing (living people)